Robert Erskine FRS (1677–1718) was a Scottish physician remembered as an advisor to Tsar Peter the Great. He became one of the Tsar's most powerful advisors. He was known in Russia as Robert Karlovich Areskin.

Life

He was born on 8 September 1677 a younger son of Sir Charles Erskine, 1st Baronet of Alva and his wife Christian Dundas of Arniston. He was born in the family home of Alva House in Clackmannanshire. His younger brother was Charles Erskine, Lord Tinwald. He was also a first cousin of John Erskine, Earl of Mar (1675–1732) and Robert Dundas of Arniston, the Elder, and uncle to James Erskine, Lord Alva.

He engaged in medical studies in Edinburgh, Paris and Utrecht receiving a doctorate in medicine in the latter, and was made a Fellow of the Royal Society in 1703. He arrived in Russia in the summer of 1704 originally as physician to Alexandr Menshikov but within 6 months had found favour in the court of the tsar. Head of the entire medical chancellery, he was the Tsar's chief physician. He was appointed the first director of the St. Petersburg Kunstkamera and library with Johann Daniel Schumacher as his assistant. He created Russia's first herbarium in 1709.

In 1716, the Tsar elevated him to privy councillor. In 1717 he escorted the Tsar on a trip to Germany, Holland and France.

He died at Olonets near St Petersburg on St Andrew's Day, 30 November 1718 and was buried in the Alexander Nevsky Lavra in St Petersburg on 4 February 1719 being granted a full state funeral attended by the tsar. Erskine was a part of masonic network of Scottish Jacobites that influenced the Russian court. A memorial was erected to his memory in Alva churchyard in October 2008.

References

Sources
Collis, Robert (2009) "Hewing the Rough Stone: Masonic Influence in Peter the Great's Russia, 1689-1725". In Andreas Önnerfors, Robert Collis (eds.) Freemasonry and Fraternalism in Eighteenth-Century Russia. Sheffield Lectures on the History of Freemasonry and Fraternalism. Volume Two. The University of Sheffield.

1677 births
1718 deaths
Alumni of the University of Edinburgh
Scottish Freemasons
Peter the Great
Members of the Supreme Privy Council
Burials at Lazarevskoe Cemetery (Saint Petersburg)